King Creole can refer to:

 King Creole, a 1958 film starring Elvis Presley
 "King Creole" (song), a song by Elvis Presley from the film King Creole
 King Creole (soundtrack), an album by Elvis Presley, containing the soundtrack to the film King Creole
 King Creole (Christer Sjögren album)